STAG: A Test of Love is a reality TV show hosted by Tommy Habeeb.  Each episode profiles an engaged couple a week or two before their wedding.  The cameras then follow the groom on his bachelor party. The next day, Habeeb shows a highlight tape to the groom's fiancée to get her reaction.

The show is produced by Tommy Habeeb Enterprises and distributed by American Television Distribution.

See also
Cheaters, a similar hidden camera show that documents people suspected of cheating on their partners.

External links 
Official Website

 
 

2000s American reality television series